Events in the year 1841 in India.

Incumbents
The Earl of Auckland, Governor-General, 1836-42.
Nicol Alexander Dalzell, assistant commissioner of customs in Bombay

Events
Sino-Sikh War, May 1841 to August 1842, General Zorawar Singh Kahluria of the Sikh Empire invaded Qing Tibet
First Anglo-Afghan War, 1837-1842
Missionaries from the Presbyterian Church of Wales found the Presbyterian Church in India in the Khasi Hills in northeast India
Johann Christian Freidrich Heyer, Lutheran minister in America, becomes the first Lutheran Missionary from America to visit India
52nd Regiment of Foot comes to India from Australia
Loreto Sisters come to India and build schools
British India Society begins publishing British Indian Advocate

Law
Succession (Property Protection) Act

Births
Frederick William Spring, British Army officer and military historian
Nawab Waqar-ul-Mulk Kamboh, one of the founders of the All India Muslim League

Deaths
Zorawar Singh Kahluria, the "Napoleon of India," who invaded Tibet in the Sino-Sikh War
Ranchhodji Diwan, chief minister of Junagadh state
Prithvi Singh Deo, raja of Sonepur State
Nahar Singh, raja of Sailana State

References

 
India
Years of the 19th century in India